The Grugapark is a central park in the city of Essen, North Rhine-Westphalia, Germany. It was first opened in 1929 as the first "Große Ruhrländische Gartenbau-Ausstellung". Adjacent to the Grugapark is the Grugahalle concert hall and the Messe Essen exhibition centre.

History 
During WWII, 35 Russian forced labourers were killed by the Gestapo at a place called Montagsloch.

Gallery

References

Essen
Parks in Germany
Gardens in North Rhine-Westphalia
Protected areas established in 1929
1929 establishments in Germany